Glen Leon Collins (born July 10, 1959) is a former professional American football player who played defensive lineman for five seasons for the San Francisco 49ers and Cincinnati Bengals.

Professional football career
Glen played for the Cincinnati Bengals for four years spanning from 1982 to 1985.  He was traded to the San Francisco 49ers in 1986 where he played one year in 1987.

Broadcasting 
In 1989, Collins was the color commentator for Jackson Academy football broadcasts. Collins, who is black, was instructed by Jackson Academy athletic director Bobby West not to attend the game to be played at East Holmes Academy on account of his race. When he was later interviewed about his action, West attempted to cast blame onto a supposed third party whom he refused to name, explaining that he had "passed along the information given" to him, disclosing neither the source nor substance of any such "information."

References

1959 births
Living people
American football defensive linemen
Cincinnati Bengals players
Mississippi State Bulldogs football players
San Francisco 49ers players
Sportspeople from Jackson, Mississippi
Players of American football from Jackson, Mississippi
American color commentators
African-American sports announcers
American radio sports announcers
National Football League replacement players